End of Green is a German gothic/doom metal band formed in Stuttgart in 1992. According to singer Michael Huber, the band's name implies the end of the color green, which typically symbolizes hope. This fits with the type of music the band produces. The band describes its style as Depressed Subcore. The lyrics are about loneliness, depression, pain and death.

History

The group released their debut album Infinity on Nuclear Blast in 1996. They have performed live with artists such as Paradise Lost, Iggy Pop, and In Extremo as well as playing at Wave-Gotik-Treffen and Wacken Open Air in 2006. On 15 August 2008, The Sick's Sense was released – the band's most successful record. The limited edition includes the Sickoustic EP, an acoustic bonus CD with four previous tracks and one new one.

Members 
 Michelle Darkness – vocals
 Michael Setzer – guitar
 Oliver Merkle – guitar
 Rainer Hampel – bass
 Matthias Siffermann – drums

Discography 
Infinity (1996, Nuclear Blast, EMP)
Believe, My Friend... (1998, Subzero)
Songs for a Dying World (2002, Silverdust)
Last Night on Earth (2003, Silverdust)
Dead End Dreaming (2005, Silverdust)
The Sick's Sense (2008, Silverdust)
High Hopes in Low Places (2010)
The Painstream (2013, Napalm Records) – Charted at #13 in Germany
Void Estate (2017. Napalm Records)

Reissues 
Infinity (2002, Silverdust)
Believe, My Friend... (2002, Silverdust)

References

External links 
Official website
 End of Green at MySpace

German heavy metal musical groups
German gothic metal musical groups
Musical groups established in 1992
Dark rock groups